Francesco Forleo (13 November 1941 – 24 June 2018) was an Italian politician who served as a Deputy from 1987 to 1994.

References

1941 births
2018 deaths
Democratic Party of the Left politicians
Deputies of Legislature X of Italy
Italian Communist Party politicians
Deputies of Legislature XI of Italy
Italian police officers
Deaths from dementia in Italy